The 15th Pan-American Games were held in Rio de Janeiro, Brazil, between 13 July 2007 and 29 July 2007.

Medals

Silver

Men's Snipe Class: Pablo Defazio and Eduardo Medici

Bronze

Men's Team Competition: Uruguay national basketball team

Men's Points Race: Milton Wynants

Competitors by event

Athletics
Andrés Silva
Heber Viera
Stefanía Zoryez
Déborah Gyurcsek

Basketball

Men's Team Competition
Preliminary Round (Group B)
Defeated United States (72-81)
Lost to Argentina (69-71)
Defeated Panama (76-68)
Semi Finals
Lost to Brazil (73-85)
Bronze Medal Match
Defeated Argentina (99-93) → Bronze Medal
Team Roster
Emiliano Taboada
Mauricio Aguiar
Leandro García
Esteban Batista
Gastón Paez
Nicolás Mazzarino
Fernando Martínez
Panchi Barrera
Claudio Charquero
Martín Osimani
Juan Pablo Silveira
Sebastián Izaguirre

Beach Volleyball
Fabio Dalmás and Nicolás Zanotta
Mariana Guerrero and Karina Cardozo

Canoeing
Marcelo D'Ambrosio
Christian Vergara
Guillermo Giorgi

Cycling
Milton Wynants
Luis Morales
Alen Reyes
Fabiana Granizal

Equestrian
Ricardo Monge
Julio Álvarez
Edison Quintana

Field Hockey

Women's Team Competition
Andrea Fazzio
Carolina Mutilva
Bettiana Ceretta
Anna Karina Bissignano
Patricia Bueno
Mariana Ríos
Virginia Casabó
Eleonora Rebollo
Carolina Gibernau
Patricia Campos
Alessandra Rasso
Verónica Dupont
Virginia Bessio
Sofía Sanguinetti
Mercedes Lerena
María Algorta

Football

Women's Team Competition
Luciana Gómez
Stefanía Maggiolini
Tamy Gares
Carla Arrua
Aída Camaño
Guillermina Rodríguez
Alejandra Laborda
Paula Viera
Angélica Souza
Juliana Castro
Sindy Ramírez
Lorena López
Gabriela Paiva
Laura Far
Carla Quinteros
Inés Rusch
Natalia González
Mayra Padrón

Gymnastics
Romina Moccia

Handball

Men's Team Competition
Gonzalo Gamba
Carlos Pintos
Nicolás Orlando
Hernann Wenzel
Maximiliano Gratadoux
Pablo Poggio
Maximiliano Malfatti
Rodrigo Bernal
Sebastián Noveri
Pablo Caro
Nicolás Fabra
Gabriel Spangenberg
Pablo Marrochi
Luis Eduardo Suberbielle
Pablo Montes

Judo
Javier Terra

Karate
Manuel Costa

Modern Pentathlon
Luis Siri
Luis Benavides

Rowing
Rodolfo Collazo
Angel García
Jhonatan Esquivel
Emiliano Dumestre
Emmanuel Bouvier
Danilo Frangi
Joe Reboledo

Sailing
Santiago Silveira
Nicolás Shabán
Alejandro Foglia
Pablo Defazio
Eduardo Medici
Sebastián Raña

Shooting
Carolina Lozado
Diana Cabrera
Luis Méndez
Jorge García

Skating
María Cecilia Laurino
Maximiliano García

Swimming
Paul Kutscher
Martín Kutscher
Francisco Picasso
Gabriel Melconian
Daniel Queipo
Antonella Scanavino
Elsa Pumar
Andrea Guerra
Inés Remersaro

Taekwondo
Mayko Votta

Tennis
Marcel Felder
Federico Sansonetti
Estefanía Cracium
María Arechavaleta

Triathlon

Men's Competition
Guillermo Nantes
 2:04:16.84 — 28th place

Women's Competition
Virginia López
 2:15:18.67 — 25th place

Weightlifting
Mauricio de Marino
Edward Silva

See also
Sport in Uruguay
Uruguay at the 2008 Summer Olympics

References
Olympic Committee Uruguay

External links
Rio 2007 Official website

Nations at the 2007 Pan American Games
P
2007